Ogbadibo is a Local Government Area of Benue State, North Central, Nigeria. It has three districts namely: Orokam, Owukpa, and Otukpa.  The Local Government's headquarters is located in Otukpa Town.
 
It has an area of 598 km and a population of 128,707 as at the 2006 census.

The postal code of the area is 973.

References

Local Government Areas in Benue State